Jean Sagal is an American television actress and director. In the 1980s, she co-starred with her twin sister Liz Sagal in the television series Double Trouble that ran from 1984–85. She has since appeared on such shows as Picket Fences, Knots Landing, Quantum Leap and 21 Jump Street. She has directed episodes of Two and a Half Men, Mad TV, So Little Time and Just Shoot Me. Sagal and her twin sister also served for a time as the "Doublemint Twins" in the ad campaign by Doublemint gum.

Early life
Sagal is part of a family of entertainment industry professionals. She is the daughter of television director Boris Sagal and the stepdaughter of Marge Champion. Her siblings, older sister Katey Sagal, brother Joey Sagal and twin sister Liz Sagal, are all active in the industry.

As a director
She was the associate director for 2 Broke Girls (42 episodes), and Two and a Half Men (166 episodes). She has also directed episodes for five television shows: Wizards of Waverly Place (1 episode), Two and a Half Men (3 episodes),  MADtv (3 episodes), So Little Time (9 episodes), and  Just Shoot Me! (4 episodes).

Partial filmography

References

External links
 
 

Actresses from Los Angeles
American female dancers
Dancers from California
American film actresses
American people of Ukrainian-Jewish descent
American television actresses
American television directors
American women television directors
Identical twin actresses
Living people
American twins
20th-century American actresses
21st-century American women
Year of birth missing (living people)